Shea Adam is an American auto racing reporter on television and radio. The daughter of a news anchor and a race car driver and commentator, she was a graphics supervisor for the American Le Mans Series in 2012 and 2013. Adam subsequently made her debut as a pit lane reporter for Radio Le Mans at the 2012 24 Hours of Le Mans. She has also covered the IndyCar Series, WeatherTech SportsCar Championship (and its support series), the Bathurst 12 Hour, Pirelli World Challenge and the Mazda Raceway California 8 Hours.

Biography
Adam's mother is a former news anchor for Miami ABC affiliate WPLG, and her father Bill Adam was a race car driver for 42 years and commentated on racing events for 10 years. She was educated at the private Miami Palmer Trinity School, and attended Florida State University from 2008 until 2011, graduating with degrees in creative writing and history. Afterward, Adam worked for a car dealership which entailed the delivery of press cars across the state of Florida. She acted as a grid girl at Mid-Ohio Sports Car Course in 2011, and later wrote of this experience in an online article. Adam met Radio Le Mans commentator and owner John Hindhaugh at the 2012 24 Hours of Daytona. Hindhaugh later offered her a job reporting from the pit lane at the 24 Hours of Le Mans in June that year.

Soon after, she sent an email to American Le Mans Series broadcast producer Jim Roller and implored him for employment. Roller handed her the position of graphics supervisor in the outside broadcast truck, a role she served throughout the 2012 and 2013 seasons. Adam learnt her skills as a graphics artist through Roller's wife and her successors. She later accepted Hindhaugh's offer at commentary at Le Mans. Hence, Adam made her radio broadcast debut at the event. In July 2013, she joined Canadian sports network Sportsnet as a reporter for its telecast of the 2013 Honda Indy Toronto. Adam worked alongside her father Bill, making it the first time a father and daughter combination joined each other on a Canadian motorsports broadcast.

She joined IMSA Radio in 2015 and has acted as pit lane reporter in the WeatherTech SportsCar Championship and its support series. Adam has covered the Trans-Am Series and Bathurst 12 Hour since then. She was announced as part of the CBS Sports Network broadcast team for its coverage of the 2017 Pirelli World Challenge in February. Additionally, she reported for the network for its broadcast of the inaugural Mazda Raceway California 8 Hours later that year. Adam called a fund-raising kart race in Fort Lauderdale, Florida in October 2017.

In 2019 she served as the color commentator for the Forza RC, the esport version of Forza Motorsport 7.

References

External links
 

Year of birth missing (living people)
Living people
Florida State University alumni
Motorsport announcers
American motorsport people